Glabella is a genus of small tropical and warm-water sea snails, marine gastropod molluscs in the family Marginellidae, the margin snails.

Taxonomy
It is debatable whether it is justified to distinguish this genus from Marginella s. str. without a comprehensive phylogenetic hypothesis of the family. However the two genera cannot be objective synonyms because Marginella glabella (Linnaeus, 1758) is not one of the species originally included in Glabella.

Species
According to the World Register of Marine Species (WoRMS), the following species with valid names are included within the genus Glabella :
 Glabella adansoni Kiener, 1834
 Glabella ansonae Clover, 1976
 Glabella bellii G.B. Sowerby II, 1846
 Glabella bifasciata (Lamarck, 1822)
 Glabella davisiana Marrat, 1877
 Glabella denticulata Link, 1807
 Glabella faba (Linnaeus, 1758)
 Glabella fumigata (Gofas & Fernandes, 1994)
 Glabella harpaeformis G.B. Sowerby II, 1846
 Glabella macua Boyer, Rosado & Gori, 2018
 Glabella mirabilis H. Adams, 1869
 Glabella mozambicana Boyer, 2014
 Glabella nodata (Hinds, 1844)
 Glabella obtusa G.B. Sowerby II, 1846
 Glabella omanensis Boyer, 2014
 Glabella pseudofaba G.B. Sowerby II, 1846
 Glabella reeveana Petit, 1851
 Glabella rosadoi Kilburn, 1994
 Glabella rotunda Boyer, 2014
 Glabella tyermani (Marrat, 1876)
 Glabella xicoi (Boyer, Ryall & Wakefield, 1999)
 Glabella youngi Kilburn, 1977
Species brought into synonymy
 Glabella arenaria Mörch, 1852: synonym of Glabella denticulata (Link, 1807)
 Glabella ferreirai Alves, 1996 synonym of Glabella mozambicana Boyer, 2014
 Glabella henrikasi (Bozzetti, 1995): synonym of Marginella henrikasi Bozzetti, 1995
 Glabella lucani (Jousseaume, 1884): synonym of Marginella lucani Jousseaume, 1884

References

 Cossignani T. (2006). Marginellidae & Cystiscidae of the World. L'Informatore Piceno. 408pp

External links
 Swainson W. (1840) A treatise on malacology or shells and shell-fish. London, Longman. viii + 419 pp.
 Hinds R. B. (1844). Descriptions of Marginellae collected during the voyage of H. M. S. Sulphur, and from the collection of H. Cuming Esq. Proceedings of the Zoological Society of London. 12: 72-77.
 Gray, J. E. (1847). A list of the genera of recent Mollusca, their synonyma and types. Proceedings of the Zoological Society of London. 15: 129-219.
 Coovert G.A. & Coovert H.K. (1995) Revision of the supraspecific classification of marginelliform gastropods. The Nautilus 109(2-3): 43-110

Marginellidae